Erro (standard basque: Erroibar; Erro basque: Erroiberra) is a town and municipality located in the province and autonomous community of Navarra, northern Spain.

Its capital is Lintzoain.

References

External links
 ERRO in the Bernardo Estornés Lasa - Auñamendi Encyclopedia (Euskomedia Fundazioa) 

Municipalities in Navarre